May-Daniels & Fisher (commonly known, and doing business as "May-D&F," in later years without the hyphen) was a Denver, Colorado department store created in 1957 when the original May Company operations in Colorado, founded by David May in 1877 in Leadville (and relocated to Denver in 1888), were merged with the newly acquired The Daniels & Fisher Co. store founded in Denver in 1864. 

In 1987 May D&F absorbed 3 stores from The Denver Dry Goods Company (from the 1986 acquisition of Associated Dry Goods Corp.) and closed the other 9, and 1989 it assumed the Goldwater's location in Albuquerque, New Mexico.  It was merged into the Foley's division in 1993 which was absorbed by Macy's in 2005 when it purchased the May Department Stores Co.  The last remaining remnant of this store is the landmark Daniels & Fisher clock tower in downtown Denver which once anchored the Daniels & Fisher store, opened in 1910 and closed in 1957 when the new May-D&F store opened further up 16th Street at Courthouse Square (Zeckendorf Plaza).  The primary May Company store, built in 1906 and expanded in 1924, was demolished in 1965 for an expansion of the Colorado National Bank building. A mid-priced chain, it competed with The Denver Dry Goods Company and Joslin's for customers.

See also
 List of defunct department stores of the United States

External links
 The Daniels & Fisher clock tower
 The D&F building

Defunct department stores based in Colorado
Companies based in Denver
Retail companies disestablished in 1993
Defunct companies based in Colorado
1957 establishments in Colorado
1993 disestablishments in Colorado
Retail companies established in 1957